00 Schneider – Jagd auf Nihil Baxter (The Search for Nihil Baxter)  is a German comedy-film directed by Helge Schneider. It was released on 22 December 1994.

He wrote the script as well as the music, did film direction, and played the main character and several additional roles.

Plot
The funny clown Bratislav Metulskie is found dead in circus "Apollo". The retired commissioner 00 Schneider is asked to assume control of the case. Schneider and his aged sidekick Körschgen investigate to find the murderer, Nihil Baxter, a passionate art collector who is a little nuts and does not cultivate social contacts at all. Commissioner Schneider investigates at the circus and pays Baxter a visit. Baxter makes up an alibi and claims that he was working on a painting when the murder took place. The Sidekick Körschgen finds out that the picture is an imitation. When Baxter tries to escape to Rio by plane after he stole a sculpture from the practice of Dr. Hasenbein, 00 Schneider and his sidekick are also on board. As they are incognito, they are able to arrest the criminal with the help of the world-famous "sniffer dog nose" pilot.

Main Cast 

Helge Schneider - 00 Schneider/Nihil Baxter/Professor Hasenbein/Johnny Flash
Helmut Körschgen - Körschgen
Andreas Kunze - Friend of 00 Schneider
Werner Abrolat - Chief of Police
Bratislav Metulskie - Metulskie
Guenther Kordas - Ringmaster

References

External links

1994 films
1994 comedy films
German comedy films
1990s German-language films
1990s German films